There have been six Forster Baronetcies, four in the Baronetage of England, one in the Baronetage of Ireland and one in the Baronetage of the United Kingdom. All are extinct.

Forster of Bamburgh

The Baronetcy of Forster of Bamburgh  was created in the Baronetage of England by James I for Claudius Forster of Bamburgh Castle, Northumberland, on 7 March 1620.

The Forsters of Etherstone, Co Durham and Bamburgh, a long-established and prolific Northumbrian family, provided twelve successive Governors of Bamburgh Castle over a period of 400 years, but the family was ultimately ruined as a result of their part in the Jacobite risings in the 18th century. They subsequently lived for over 100 years at Adderstone, a property sometimes confused by modern-day Forsters with Etherstone.

Forster of Bamburgh (1620)
Sir Claudius Forster, 1st Baronet (–1623) Extinct on his death

Other notable Northumberland Forsters
Thomas Forster (1683–1738)

Forster of Aldermaston
The Baronetcy of Forster of Aldermaston was created in the Baronetage of England by James I for Humphrey Forster of Aldermaston Court, Berkshire on 20 May 1620.

The Forsters of Aldermaston descended from the Forsters of Harpsden in Oxfordshire and supposedly from the Forsters of Bamburgh Castle in Northumberland.

Forster of Aldermaston (1620)
Sir Humphrey Forster, 1st Baronet (1595–1663)
Sir Humphrey Forster, 2nd Baronet

Forster of East Greenwich
The Baronetcy of Forster of East Greenwich  was created on 11 July 1661 in the Baronetage of England for Reginald Forster, a London goldsmith who served at the Court of Charles I. The 2nd Baronet married a Warwickshire heiress but died childless and the Baronetcy became extinct.

Forster of East Greenwich (1661)
 Sir Reginald Forster, 1st Baronet (1618–84)
 Sir Reginald Forster, 2nd Baronet (1640–1705) Extinct on his death

Forster of Coolderry
The Baronetcy of Forster of Coolderry, County Monaghan  was created in the Baronetage of Ireland on 15 January 1794 for Thomas Forster.

Forster of Coolderry (1794)
Sir Thomas Forster, 1st Baronet (1751–1843)
Sir George Forster, 2nd Baronet (1796–1876), MP for Monaghan 1852–1865
Sir Thomas Oriel Forster, 3rd Baronet (1824–1895)
Sir Robert Forster, 4th Baronet (1827–1904)

Forster of Lysways Hall
The Baronetcy of Forster of Lysways Hall was created in the Baronetage of the United Kingdom on 17 March 1874 for Charles Forster, of Lysways Hall, Longdon, Staffordshire, Member of Parliament for Walsall 1852–91, son of Charles Smith Forster, banker, of Walsall, and High Sheriff of Staffordshire 1845.

Forster of Lysways Hall (1874)
Sir Charles Forster, 1st Baronet (1815–1891)
Sir Charles Forster, 2nd Baronet (1841–1914) married on 1899 Mary, daughter of the late Archdale Villiers Palmer, of Nazeing Park, Essex.
Sir Francis Villiers Forster, 3rd Baronet (1850–1930) Extinct on his death

Forster of The Grange
The Baronetcy of Forster of The Grange was created in the Baronetage of the United Kingdom on 2 February 1912 for Ralph Forster, of The Grange, Sutton, Surrey.

Forster of The Grange (1912)
Sir Ralph Collingwood Forster, 1st Baronet (1850–1930) Extinct on his death
Eva (b. 1889) married on 1917 Major Francis Rowley Hill and had issue:
Ralph Francis (b. 1920)
Ruth (b. 1891) married on 1920 Capt. Andreas J. Floor, and had issue.
Hilda (b. 1893) married on 1927 Col. James Forbes Robertson, and had issue.

References

Extinct baronetcies in the Baronetage of England
Extinct baronetcies in the Baronetage of Ireland
Extinct baronetcies in the Baronetage of the United Kingdom
People from Aldermaston
People from Northumberland